Lakeside Union School District may refer to:

 Lakeside Union School District (Bakersfield) in Bakersfield, California
 Lakeside Union Elementary School District (Kings County) in Hanford, California
 Lakeside Union School District (Lakeside) in Lakeside, California